Susan Reed may refer to:
Susan Reed (district attorney) (born 1950), former district attorney of Bexar County, Texas, U.S.
Susan Reed (singer) (1926–2010), American singer, harpist, zitherist and actor
Susan Reed, swimmer at synchronised swimming at the 1986 World Aquatics Championships